One Bangkok is a US$3.9 billion mixed-use development under construction in Bangkok, Thailand.  One Bangkok is being developed by Frasers Property, a subsidiary of TCC Group, one of Thailand's largest conglomerates.  It is expected to open in stages between 2023 and 2026.   

The One Bangkok site occupies an area of 16.7 hectares (41 acres) overlooking Lumpinee Park at the corner of Rama IV Road and Witthayu Road in Pathum Wan district.  The site was previously occupied by a night market and the old Lumpini Boxing Stadium.   

The development comprises five office towers, three hotels/service apartment towers, interconnected retail podiums, art and cultural venues, with 8 hectares of plazas and landscaped green spaces.  The project incorporated many sustainability design features such as a centralised energy and water management system, and the use of recycled waste building materials in construction. It is the first project in Thailand to target a LEED Platinum for neighbourhood development.  The development will be directly linked to the Lumphini underground MRT station via underground basement and tunnels.

Development zones and buildings 
One Bangkok is planned as an integrated district that will accommodate a living and working population of 60,000, and up to 200,000 daily visitors. 

The project includes five Grade-A office towers ranging between 40 and 92 storeys, three luxury hotels and service apartment towers and four retail precincts with a combined gross floor area of 1.83 million square metres. The retail precinct will accommodate 450 stores with 180,000 square metres of net lettable area.

It has been announced that the Ritz-Carlton Hotel will occupy the first 25 floor of a 50-storey office tower.  

The tallest building within the complex is the 92-storey Signature Tower, which at 436 metres (1,435 feet) in height will become Bangkok's and Thailand's tallest building upon completion.

External links 

 Official website
 Frasers Property Information Page

References 

Mixed-use developments
Buildings and structures in Bangkok
2023 establishments in Asia